Capperia salanga is a moth of the family Pterophoridae. It is found in Afghanistan, Iran, Turkmenistan and Turkey.

The wingspan is 14–16 mm. The forewings and hindwings are light brown.

References

Moths described in 1995
Oxyptilini